Hanafiah bin Hussain (born 16 April 1927) is a Malaysian politician and accountant.

Background
Hanafiah was born in Yan, Kedah to ethnic Malay parents of Acehnese desecent who immigrated from Aceh, Sumatra, Indonesia, long prior to his birth during the British and Dutch colonial rules of both Malaya and the East Indies. He attended the Sultan Abdul Hamid College and gained an accountancy degree from Victoria University of Manchester in 1953, followed by a professional qualification from the Association of Chartered Accountants and later as a fellow of the Institute of Chartered Accountants in England and Wales (ICAEW).

Politics
Hanafiah participated actively in politics and later on, in trade and diplomacy. From 1964 to 1974, he served as Member of Parliament for the Jerai, Kedah constituency. From 1965 to 1970, he was UMNO Treasurer-General, Member of the UMNO Supreme Council, and Chairman of the Parliament's Public Accounts Committee for two terms.

Election results

Honours and awards
  :
  Member of the Order of the Defender of the Realm (AMN) (1961)
 :
 Recipient of the Malaysian Commemorative Medal (Silver) (PPM) (1965)
  Commander of the Order of Loyalty to the Crown of Malaysia (PSM) – Tan Sri (2001)
  :
  Knight Companion of the Order of Loyalty to the Royal House of Kedah (DSDK) – Dato' (1988)

Lifetime achievement award from the Malaysian Institute of Accountants.
Anugerah Tokoh Melayu Terbilang 2017 from UMNO.

References

1927 births
Malaysian people of Acehnese descent
People from Kedah
Living people
United Malays National Organisation politicians
Malaysian people of Malay descent
Members of the Dewan Rakyat
Commanders of the Order of Loyalty to the Crown of Malaysia
Members of the Order of the Defender of the Realm